Bali bombings can refer to either of two separate incidents on the Indonesian island of Bali:
 
 The 2002 Bali bombings, 12 October 2002 in the tourist district of Kuta
 The 2005 Bali bombings, 1 October 2005 in Jimbaran Beach Resort and Kuta